Electrohydrogenesis or biocatalyzed electrolysis is the name given to a process for generating hydrogen gas from organic matter being decomposed by bacteria.  This process uses a modified fuel cell to contain the organic matter and water.  A small amount, 0.2–0.8 V of electricity is used, the original article reports an overall energy efficiency of 288% can be achieved (this is computed relative to the amount of electricity used, waste heat lowers the overall efficiency).  This work was reported by Cheng and Logan.

See also
Biohydrogen
Electrochemical reduction of carbon dioxide
Electromethanogenesis
Fermentative hydrogen production
Microbial fuel cell

References

External links
Biocatalyzed electrolysis

Hydrogen production
Environmental engineering
Biotechnology